The Opatrny Village Site is an ancient village site dating from AD 1000–1600. The site was inhabited by the Monongahela culture and is a contemporary with the Fort Ancient cultural way of life. The property was placed on the National Register on 1975-05-21.

The extent of the site has not been fully determined as the artifacts lie in occupational debris over 1.5 feet thick. The site has been used as a pasture and remains largely intact. The property was placed to protect the integrity of the site from a highway project.

Around 1980, an extensive excavation was carried out at Opatrny; the information that it yielded was seen as highly significant in understanding the ways that local cultures changed and developed their surrounding terrain.  Despite its location along U.S. Route 40, the village remains less disturbed by modern development than most surrounding terrain.

References

Further reading
Ohio Historical Society, Division of Archeology; The Opatrny Village Site; Ohio Historical Society; Columbus, Ohio 1974
"Radiocarbon Information from Eastern Ohio and a Summary of the Late Prehistoric Occupation at the Opatrny Village Site".  Ohio Archaeologist 29.2 (1979): 40–41.

External links
Pottery and diagram of the site

Archaeological sites on the National Register of Historic Places in Ohio
Archaeological sites in Belmont County, Ohio
National Register of Historic Places in Belmont County, Ohio
Monongahela culture
Native American populated places